Handball-Bundesliga, is the top women's professional handball league in Germany.

2022-23 season teams

Thüringer HC
SG BBM Bietigheim
TuS Metzingen
Borussia Dortmund Handball
Buxtehuder SV
VfL Oldenburg
HSG Blomberg-Lippe
Bad Wildungen Vipers
Bayer 04 Leverkusen
Neckarsulmer SU
HSG Bensheim-Auerbach
SV Union Halle-Neustadt
BSV Sachsen Zwickau
VfL Waiblingen

EHF league ranking
EHF League Ranking for 2022/23 season:

7.  (7)  Prva Liga (61.33)
8.  (9)  1. HRL (57.00) 
9.  (8)  Handball-Bundesliga Frauen (56.33) 
10.  (11)  1. A DRL'11.  (10)   SHE Women (37.40)
12.  (13'')  PGNiG Superliga (33.00)

Champions by years

Champions by number of titles

References

External links
www.hbf-info.de

Handball-Bundesliga
Germany
Women's handball in Germany
Women's sports leagues in Germany
Professional sports leagues in Germany